Religion in Mongolia has been traditionally dominated by the schools of Mongolian Buddhism and by Mongolian shamanism, the ethnic religion of the Mongols. Historically, through their Mongol Empire the Mongols were exposed to the influences of Christianity (Nestorianism and Catholicism) and Islam, although these religions never came to dominate. During the communist period of the Mongolian People's Republic (1924–1992) all religions were suppressed, but with the transition to the parliamentary republic in the 1990s there has been a general revival of faiths.

According to the national census of 2020, 51.7% of the Mongolians identify as Buddhists, 40.6% as non-religious, 3.2% as Muslims (predominantly of Kazakh ethnicity), 2.5% as followers of the Mongol shamanic tradition, 1.3% as Christians, and 0.7% as followers of other religions.

Demographics

Main religions

Buddhism

Buddhism in Mongolia began with the Yuan dynasty (1271-1368) emperors' conversion to Tibetan Buddhism. The Mongols returned to indigenous shamanic traditions after the collapse of the Mongol Empire, but Buddhism reemerged in the sixteenth and seventeenth centuries. During the communist Mongolian People's Republic (1924–1992), Buddhism was suppressed. After the collapse of communism in the 1990s, there has been a resurgence of Buddhism in the country, both within the fold of the traditional monastic institution and through the spread of New Age-inspired and monotheism-inspired new religious movements of Buddhism. According to the 2020 census of Mongolia, 51.7% of the population, that is 1,704,480 people, are adherents of Buddhism.

Mongolian shamanism

Mongolian shamanism, more broadly called the Mongolian folk religion, or occasionally Tengerism, refers to the animistic and shamanic ethnic religion that has been practiced by the Mongols at least since the age of recorded history. The Mongolian name of the practice is Böö mörgöl (Бөө мөргөл). In the earliest known stages it was tied to all other aspects of social life and to the tribal organization of Mongolian society. When the Mongols adopted Buddhism, Mongolian shamanism was influenced and merged with the new religion. During the communist republic of the twentieth century it was heavily repressed, but after the fall of communism it was revived. According to the 2020 census, 2.5% of the population of Mongolia, that is 82,422 people, declare that they are shamans.

Mongolian shamanism is centered on the worship of the tngri (gods) and the highest Tenger ("Heaven", "God of Heaven", or "God"), also called Qormusta Tengri. In the Mongolian folk religion, Genghis Khan is considered one of the embodiments, if not the main embodiment, of the supreme God. The Mausoleum of Genghis Khan in Ordos City, in Inner Mongolia, is an important center of this tradition.

Yellow shamanism is the term used to designate the particular version of Mongolian shamanism which adopts the expressive style of Buddhism. "Yellow" indicates Buddhism in Mongolian culture, since most Buddhists there belong to what is called the Gelug or "Yellow sect" of Tibetan Buddhism, whose members wear yellow hats while performing rituals. The term also serves to distinguish it from a form of shamanism not influenced by Buddhism, called black shamanism.

Abrahamic religions

Christianity

Christianity in Mongolia is the religion of 42,859 people according to the 2020 census, corresponding to 1.3% of the population. Christians in Mongolia include Protestants, Catholics, Orthodox Christians, and Mormons of the Church of Jesus Christ of Latter-day Saints.

Islam

Islam in Mongolia is the religion of 105,500 people as of the 2020 census, corresponding to 3.2% of the population. It is mostly the religion of the Kazakh ethnic minority residing in the areas of Bayan-Ölgii Province and Khovd Province in western Mongolia. However, Kazakh communities may be found in cities and towns throughout all Mongolia.

Other religions

The 2020 census counted 23,078 people who were adherents of religions other than Buddhism, Mongolian shamanism, Islam or Christianity, corresponding to 0.7% of the total population of the country.

The Bahá'í Faith was introduced in Mongolia only in the 1980s and 1990s, as prior to that point the communist ideology suppressed religions and impeded the spread of new ones. The first Bahá'í arrived in Mongolia in 1988, and founded a community of believers, later establishing a Bahá'í Local Spiritual Assembly. In 1994, the Bahá'ís elected their first National Spiritual Assembly.

Hinduism too has spread into Mongolia in the 1990s, after the collapse of the communist republic. The International Society for Krishna Consciousness (Hare Krishna) and Patanjali Yogpeeth have established themselves in Mongolia; at the same time some Mongolian Buddhists have incorporated Hindu concepts and techniques into their Buddhist religion.

See also
 Religion in Inner Mongolia
 Religion in China

References

Bibliography